Eugène Rouché (18 August 1832 – 19 August 1910) was a French mathematician.

Career

He was an alumnus of the École Polytechnique, which he entered in 1852. He went on to become professor of mathematics at the Charlemagne lyceum then at the École Centrale, and admissions examiner at his alma mater. He is best known for Rouché's theorem in complex analysis, which he published in his alma mater's institutional journal in 1862, and for the Rouché–Capelli theorem in linear algebra.

His son, Jacques, was a noted patron of the arts who managed the Paris Opera for thirty years (1914–1944).

See also

 Rouché's theorem
 Rouché–Capelli theorem

References
 Rouché et Comberousse (de), Traité de géométrie, tomes I et II, 7e édition, 1900 (réédition Jacques Gabay 1997).

External links
 Biography  at the St Andrews university website

1832 births
1910 deaths
People from Gard
École Polytechnique alumni
Academic staff of École Polytechnique
19th-century French mathematicians
Members of the French Academy of Sciences
Members of the Ligue de la patrie française